James Edward Blair (August 5, 1871 – March 8, 1913) was an American football player and coach and physician. He was early professional football player with the Latrobe Athletic Association. He later relocated to Burlington, New Jersey where he took a prominent part in the city council for a time and was a surgeon for the Third Battalion of the New Jersey National Guard. He was a charter member of the Burlington Elks Lodge and was a thirty-second degree Mason. He also was affiliated with the Sons of Veterans.

Football
Blair began his career with the Latrobe A. A. in 1895 as an amateur player. However, his major claim to fame came when a scheduling conflict led to him being replaced by John Brallier, who became the first openly professional football player. 

In 1895 Blair found himself in a scheduling conflict. Edward, who also played baseball in nearby Greensburg, discovered it that the team's first football game against the Jeannette Athletic Association conflicted with a prior baseball commitment. Latrobe manager David Berry, who was now seeking a replacement for Blair, had heard of Brallier's performance as the Indiana Normal quarterback and signed him to play in the game for $10 plus expenses.

Blair served as the head football coach at Sewanee: The University of the South in 1896.

College
Blair attended Saint Vincent College, located in Latrobe. He graduated from that school in 1892. Afterwards he attended the University of Pennsylvania where he played college football and college baseball. During his time at Penn, Blair played halfback on the football team and was a three year varsity player on the baseball team.

Family and death
Blair was born in 1871 to Mr. and Mrs. John C. Blair, both of whom outlived him. He had two brothers, both of whom he outlived: Charles Richard Blair and Paul Blair, who also played on the Latrobe team. Blair died from a heart ailment, on March 8, 1913, at Medico-Chi Hospital in Philadelphia. He had a wife and a son, who was seven at the time of his death.

Head coaching record

References

External links
 

1871 births
1913 deaths
19th-century players of American football
19th-century baseball players
19th-century American physicians
20th-century American physicians
American football halfbacks
American football quarterbacks
American Freemasons
Latrobe Athletic Association players
Penn Quakers baseball players
Penn Quakers football players
Sewanee Tigers football coaches
Saint Vincent College alumni
People from Burlington, New Jersey
People from Latrobe, Pennsylvania
Coaches of American football from Pennsylvania
Players of American football from Pennsylvania
Baseball players from Pennsylvania
New Jersey city council members
Physicians from Philadelphia
Physicians from New Jersey